Smith and Williams was an architecture firm based in South Pasadena, California and created in 1949. They were noted for their Modernist and Googie design style. The firm developed buildings and master planned communities. The Smith-Williams partnership was active until 1973.

They were described by Robert Winter as being experts in domestic architecture.

History
Whitney R. Smith and Wayne Richard Williams began working together in 1946. Smith left the architecture firm in 1973.

Smith
Whitney Rowland Smith (Pasadena, California - , Bend, Oregon) attended Pasadena City College, then graduated from USC around 1934. He then worked under Harwell Hamilton Harris and William Pereira in 1939–1940. He taught architecture at USC around 1945. He contributed to four designs in the Case Study Houses; two were built.

Williams
Wayne Richard Williams (Los Angeles, California - , Leesburg, Virginia) was born in Los Angeles in 1919, and went on to study architecture at USC until World War II, when he designed military buildings. After the war he received his architecture bachelor's degree from USC in 1947. He worked under Smith at USC, then established the firm together. Later, Williams worked for Giuseppe Cecchi's International Developers Inc. Williams became a fellow at the American Institute of Architects in 1964. Williams taught at UC-Berkeley in 1970.

Significant designs
 Mutual Housing Tract, custom homes in Brentwood designed with A. Quincy Jones, Edgardo Contini, and James Charlton. 500 houses were designed, 82 were built.
 Friend Paper Company building, Pasadena (1965)
 Smith and Williams building, 1414 Fair Oaks, South Pasadena
 Googie-styled Mobile gas station, Harbor Boulevard, Anaheim (1956)
 Full Moon Tea House, Descanso Gardens (1966 with blue glazed tile roofing from Nara, Japan)
 Blue Ribbon Tract Housing, Reseda, Los Angeles (1953)
 Dorr-Siegel-Click-Hurley Medical Building, distinctively circular and diamond shaped psychiatric office from 1964
 Microdot company building, South Pasadena
 Palmitas and Cedritos residence halls at Cal Poly Pomona

 Buena Park City Hall
 Neighborhood Church (aka Neighborhood Unitarian Universalist Church), Pasadena, California
 Thatcher Music Building, Scripps College, Claremont, California

Master planned communities:
 Mission Bay Park, San Diego
 California City, California, designed with Garrett Eckbo; partially built, their designs are echoed in the Pavilion and Community Church
 Newport Dunes, for Irvine Company, unbuilt
 Port Holiday, unbuilt Lake Mead development for J. Carlton Adair

References

External links
 USModernist: Smith and Williams homes

Design companies established in 1949
Architecture firms based in California
Design companies disestablished in 1973
South Pasadena, California
American companies established in 1949
American companies disestablished in 1973
Companies based in Los Angeles County, California
1949 establishments in California